In biology, weapons are traits that are used by males to fight one another off for access to mates. A mate is won in battle either by a male chasing off a fellow competitor or killing it off, usually leaving the victor as the only option for the female to reproduce with. However, because stronger organisms, whether mentally or physically, are usually favored in combat, this also leads to the evolution of stronger organisms in species that use combat as a way to secure mates, via intrasexual selection. Examples of weapons include: antlers, horns, and ossicones.

Gallery

References

Mating
Weapons
Sexual selection